The Mr. Hong Kong Contest, or Mr.HK (港生) for short, is a beauty contest for young men, organized by leading Hong Kong television station TVB. The contest since 2005, suspended during 2012 to 2015, and 2017. Winners will have the opportunity to represent Hong Kong for the Mister World contest.

Like the Miss Hong Kong Pageant, top Mr. Hong Kong contestants are awarded to a contract with TVB, and many of them become promoted television actors. A contestant and runner-up in 2005, Byron Pang, even went on to become a film star. In his first film role, in the 2009 Hong Kong movie Amphetamine, his pubic hair, penis and testicles were fully exposed on camera, in several scenes.

The contest also has other consolation prizes that vary slightly from year to year. Unlike their female counterpart, Mr. Hong Kong does not have specific first and second runner-up positions. Contestants are divided into two groups, the Stylish Youth Division (瀟灑少年) and the Maturity Division (健力盛年), and a winner is chosen from both groups. The final winner (the Mr. Hong Kong) will then be determined by the top contestants of both groups. But from 2016, first and second runner-up positions added as first time, also the minimum participant age limit has lowered to 16.

Judges for the contest are all women, and winners of the contest are also determined by a public vote of 600 to 800 female viewers. The first ever winner of the contest was Matthew Ko.

The modern Mr. Hong Kong Contest is completely unrelated to the original Mr. Hong Kong bodybuilding contest from the 1970s.

Summary of winners

Notable winners and contestants
 Matthew Ko 高鈞賢 (Mr. Hong Kong 2005; actor)
 Rocky Cheng 鄭健樂 (Mr. Hong Kong 2005 runner-up; actor)
 Stephen Wong 黃長興 (Maturity division runner-up 2005; actor)
 Francois Huynh 黃長發 (Mr. Hong Kong 2006; actor)
 Benjamin Yuen 袁偉豪 (Mr. Hong Kong 2007; actor)

Hosts

Controversy
Hong Kong Broadcasting Authority has received a number of complaints from the public regarding the Mr. Hong Kong Contest, in which the programme was said to be of bad taste and that the male contestants were treated as sex objects by the women in the show.  These complaints were later dismissed.

See also
 Miss Hong Kong

References

External links
 2005 MRHK Official Page
 2006 MRHK Official Page
 2007 MRHK Official Page
 2008 MRHK Official Page
 2009 MRHK Official Page
 2010 MRHK Official Page
 2011 MRHK Official Page
 2016 MRHK Official Page

Recurring events established in 2005
Hong Kong television shows
TVB original programming
Hong Kong
Beauty pageants in Hong Kong
2005 establishments in Hong Kong
Hong Kong awards